The Court of King's Bench (or Court of Queen's Bench during the reign of a Queen) was one of the senior courts of common law in Ireland. It was a mirror of the Court of King's Bench in England. The Lord Chief Justice was the most senior judge in the court, and the second most senior Irish judge under English rule and later when Ireland became part of the United Kingdom. Additionally, for a brief period between 1922 and 1924, the Lord Chief Justice of Ireland was the most senior judge in the Irish Free State.

History of the position

The office was created during the Lordship of Ireland (1171–1536) and continued in existence under the Kingdom of Ireland (1536–1800) and the United Kingdom of Great Britain and Ireland. Prior to the Supreme Court of Judicature Act (Ireland) 1877, the Lord Chief Justice presided over the Court of King's/Queen's Bench, and as such ranked foremost amongst the judges sitting at common law. After 1877, the Lord Chief Justice assumed the presidency of the Queen's Bench Division of the new High Court of Justice, which sat permanently in the Four Courts in Dublin.

Thomas Lefroy, later Lord Chief Justice of Ireland (LCJ 1852–1866), was used by Jane Austen as the model for her Pride and Prejudice character Mr. Darcy. Lefroy and Austen had had a romance in their youths. Other prominent Lord Chief Justices of Ireland include Lord Whiteside (LCJ 1866–1876), who as a Queen's Counsel had defended Irish nationalist leader Daniel O'Connell in court, Gerald FitzGerald, 3rd Earl of Desmond, Hugh de Lacy, Risteárd de Tiúit, John Doherty, Thomas Marlay, James Ley, Peter O'Brien, and James Henry Mussen Campbell, 1st Baron Glenavy (LCJ 1916–1918, later Chairman of Seanad Éireann and grandfather of the satirist Patrick Campbell). One Lord Chief Justice, Lord Kilwarden, was killed by a crowd during Robert Emmet's 1803 rebellion.

Abolition of the position

The abolition of the position of Lord Chief Justice of Ireland was originally envisaged in a draft of the Government of Ireland Bill 1920. The Bill originally proposed that the Lord Chief Justice of Ireland would become the Lord Chief Justice of Southern Ireland. However, the then incumbent, The Rt. Hon. Sir Thomas Molony, 1st Bt., vigorously lobbied for the right to continue to hold the title even after the Bill was passed. Ultimately, his arguments were at least in part accepted: The Act, in its transitional provisions, provided that while he would in effect be the first Lord Chief Justice of Southern Ireland, his title remained that of Lord Chief Justice of Ireland, although this was a transitional provision and was not a right to be enjoyed by his successors.

Subsequently, the highest-ranking judicial posting in Ireland, that of Lord Chancellor of Ireland, was abolished in December 1922. This left the office of the Lord Chief Justice of Ireland as the most senior judge in the Irish Free State but not for very long. The Constitution of the Irish Free State adopted in December 1922 clearly envisaged the early establishment of new courts for the nascent state and the abolition of the position of the Lord Chief Justice of Ireland. However, this only took place when the Courts of Justice Act 1924 was finally adopted. Under that Act, the position of the Chief Justice of the Irish Free State superseded the position of Lord Chief Justice of Ireland as the highest judicial office in the Irish Free State.

In what became Northern Ireland, the position was superseded by the position of Lord Chief Justice of Northern Ireland.

List of holders

Sources
 List from Liber Munerum Publicorum Hiberniae, by Rowley Lascelles, copied in Haydn's Book of Dignities
 Names from 1852 onwards from The Oxford Companion to Law, ed David M. Walker, 1980
 Francis Elrington Ball The Judges in Ireland 1221–1921 2 Vols (John Murray London 1926)

References

Further reading
 Daire Hogan, R.R. Cherry, Lord Chief Justice of Ireland, 1914–16

External links
 Lord Chief Justice O'Brien anecdotes
 Tim Healy, QC, MP Anecdotes about Lord Chief Justice O'Brien
 Order of the Governor-General of the Irish Free State concerning the substitution of 'Saorstát Éireann' for 'Southern Ireland'
 Text about Sir Richard Cox, Lord Chief Justice of Ireland
 'Ireland's Millennia: RTÉ biography of James Campbell, 1st Baron Glenavy, LCJ 1916–1918
 Part of the process of changing laws to replace 'Lord Chief Justice of Ireland' with 'Chief Justice of Ireland'

Law of Northern Ireland
Legal history of Ireland
Political office-holders in pre-partition Ireland